The Shire of Southern Grampians is a local government area  (LGA) in the Barwon South West region of Victoria, Australia, located in the south-western part of the state. It includes the towns of Coleraine, Hamilton, Dunkeld and Penshurst. It was formed in 1994 from the amalgamation of the City of Hamilton, Shire of Wannon and parts of the Shire of Dundas, Shire of Kowree, Shire of Mount Rouse and Shire of Heywood.

The Shire is governed and administered by the Southern Grampians Shire Council; its seat of local government and administrative centre is located at the council headquarters in Hamilton, it also has service centres located in a couple of other locations within Hamilton. The Shire is named after the major geographical feature in the region, The Grampians, and that the southern part of this feature occupies the northern part of the LGA.

Traditional owners 
The traditional owners of this shire are the Gunditjmara, Tjap Wurrung and Bunganditj people.

Council

Current composition
The council is composed of seven councillors elected to represent an unsubdivided municipality. Council Composition as of September 2022:

Administration and governance
The council meets in the council chambers at the council headquarters in the Hamilton Municipal Offices, which is also the location of the council's administrative activities. It also provides customer services at both its administrative centre on Brown Street in Hamilton, and its service centres on Market Pl and Roberts St in Hamilton.

Townships and localities
The 2021 census, the shire had a population of 16,588 up from 15,944 in the 2016 census

^ - Territory divided with another LGA

See also
List of localities (Victoria)

References

External links

Southern Grampians Shire Council official website
Metlink local public transport map 
Link to Land Victoria interactive maps

Local government areas of Victoria (Australia)
Barwon South West (region)